Gorgonidia vulcania is a moth of the family Erebidae first described by Hervé de Toulgoët in 1987. It is found in French Guiana and Suriname.

References

 

Phaegopterina
Moths described in 1987